Zheng Mao was the primary wife of King Cheng of the State of Chu during the Spring and Autumn period of ancient China.  She is one of 125 women whose biographies are included in the Biographies of Exemplary Women, written by Liu Xiang.

Life
Zheng Mao was born to the Ying clan from the state of Zheng, which had fallen into decline after the death of Duke Zhuang. She was sent with the primary wife as a concubine for King Cheng of Chu (ruled. 671–626 BC).

After she arrived at the Chu palace, the king looked down on the women's quarters and noticed her not looking up no matter what he offered her. He then made her his principal wife. Both she and his chief minister cautioned against the appointment of his son Shangchen as crown prince. After the king ignored the advice, Shangchen caused the downfall of the minister. After this, the King wanted to appoint a younger son as heir apparent instead, but now Zheng Mao advised against this, predicting civil war.

Believing the king suspected her opposition against Shangchen was based on jealousy, she committed suicide. Not long after, Shangchen staged a coup d'etat and forced the King Cheng to commit suicide.  Shangchen then ascended the throne as King Mu of Chu.

Inclusion in the Lienü zhuan
The Han Dynasty scholar Liu Xiang included her biography in the Biographies of Exemplary Women. Zheng Mao's biography is part of Scroll 5, titled the Principled and Righteous.

Notes

Work Referenced

External links
Lienu zhuan, University of Virginia E-text

7th-century BC Chinese women
Suicides in China
Zhou dynasty nobility
Zheng (state)
Chu state people
7th-century BC Chinese people
Ancient people who committed suicide